is a railway station in Kita-ku, Hamamatsu,  Shizuoka Prefecture, Japan, operated by the third sector Tenryū Hamanako Railroad.

Lines
Okaji Station is served by the Tenryū Hamanako Line, and is located 43.5 kilometers from the starting point of the line at Kakegawa Station.

Station layout
The station has single side platform and no station building. It is unattended.

Adjacent stations

|-
!colspan=5|Tenryū Hamanako Railroad

Station history
The station, originally called , was established on March 15, 1987, the date the former Futamata Line of the Japanese National Railways was succeeded by the Tenryū Hamanako Railroad as its Tenryū Hamanako Line. The station was used by students of nearby Kiga High School, from which the station took the name.

Because the high school was to be closed, the station name was changed to the present one on March 14, 2015, concurrently with the opening of Morimachibyōin-mae Station.

Passenger statistics
In fiscal 2016, the station was used by an average of 24 passengers daily (boarding passengers only).

Surrounding area
Japan National Route 362

See also
 List of Railway Stations in Japan

References

External links

  Tenryū Hamanako Railroad Station information 
 

Railway stations in Shizuoka Prefecture
Railway stations in Japan opened in 1987
Stations of Tenryū Hamanako Railroad
Railway stations in Hamamatsu